is a Prefectural Natural Park in western Miyazaki Prefecture, Japan. Established in 1966, the park is within the municipality of Ebino.

See also
 National Parks of Japan

References

External links
  Map of Yatake Kōgen Prefectural Natural Park

Parks and gardens in Miyazaki Prefecture
Protected areas established in 1966
1966 establishments in Japan